Lai Lee-chiao (born 15 January 1955) is a Taiwanese hurdler. She competed in the women's 400 metres hurdles at the 1984 Summer Olympics.

References

1955 births
Living people
Athletes (track and field) at the 1984 Summer Olympics
Taiwanese female hurdlers
Olympic athletes of Taiwan
Place of birth missing (living people)